Ferdinand is a surname. Notable people with the surname include:

Anton Ferdinand (born 1985), English footballer
Kane Ferdinand (born 1992), Irish footballer
Les Ferdinand (born 1966), English footballer and coach
Rio Ferdinand (born 1978), English footballer and pundit